Moissy-Cramayel is a commune in the Seine-et-Marne department in the Île-de-France region in north-central France.

Its inhabitants are called Moisséens.

History
During the French Revolution, Moissy-Cramayel was temporarily renamed Moissy-la-Plaine, meaning "Moissy the Plain".

Population

Transportation
Moissy-Cramayel is served by Lieusaint – Moissy station on Paris RER line .

Town twinning
Moissy-Cramayel is twinned with:
 Rosenfeld, Germany - since 1971
 Rosso, Mauritania - since 1986
 Bușteni, Romania - since 1993

See also
 Communes of the Seine-et-Marne department
 Moissy Cramayel US, a football club based in Moissy-Cramayel

References

External links

Official website 
1999 Land Use, from IAURIF (Institute for Urban Planning and Development of the Paris-Île-de-France région) 
 

Communes of Seine-et-Marne
Sénart